Taroko Square is a shopping mall in North District, Hsinchu, Taiwan that opened on June 1, 2018 (trial operation on May 11). It is jointly developed by Taroko Group and RT-Mart. The principal stores of the mall are the Taroko baseball and softball field and the SportPark pulley field, Fitness factory, amusement, Nitori home furnishings and various themed restaurants.

History
 Taroko Square officially began construction on June 22, 2016. RT-Mart spent NT$1 billion to construct the building. Taroko Group developed and leased the building for 17 years and was responsible for decoration and subsequent operations. This mall is the first cooperation case between Taroko Group and RT-Mart.
 On May 11, 2018, the Taroko Square was put into trial operation; it officially opened on June 1 of the same year.

Gallery

See also
 List of tourist attractions in Taiwan
 Big City (shopping mall)

References

External links

 

2018 establishments in Taiwan
Shopping malls in Hsinchu City
Shopping malls established in 2018